Harriet was launched at New York in 1810. She was captured and sold as a prize in 1813 to British owners. She was wrecked at Fanning's Island in late 1831 or early 1832.

Career
Harriet first appeared in Lloyd's Register (LR) in 1818 with S.Skelling, master and owner, and trade London–Demerara.

On 23 May Harriet, Skelling, master, arrived at Barbados from London. On 23 July Harriet, Skilling, master, was off Dover, having come from Barbados; Skellin arrived at Gravesend that same day. In October Harriet sailed for Demerara.

Incident: On 3 November 1825 there was a report from Margate that Harriet, Fulcher, master, had come from Singapore. While in the Downs she was driven from there, losing her anchors and cables. She then went to Broadstairs to supply.

LR and the RS for 1832 showed Harriet, W.Buckle, master, Kenner (or Kenniers), owner, and trade London–New South Wales.

Fate
The New Zealand Herald carried a report on 19 July 1832 dated Otaheite 10 April. The commander of  reported having seen Captain Buckle at Otaheite, Harriet having been lost at Fanning's Island. On 10 September Lloyd's List reported that Harriet, Buckle, master, had wrecked at "Fenning's Island". On 20 September the Nautical Magazine and Naval Chronicle of London reported that the British  whaler Harriet, Buckle, master, had been wrecked at "Tanning's Island"; her crew had survived.

In 1834 Harriets register was cancelled as she had been lost at sea.

Citations

References
 

1810 ships
Ships built in the United States
Captured ships
Age of Sail merchant ships of England
Whaling ships
Maritime incidents in 1832